Antonio Salvi (17 January 1664 – 21 May 1724) was an Italian physician, court poet and librettist, active mainly in Florence, Italy. Salvi was one of the developers of the opera seria.

Life 
Salvi was born in Lucignano and became a court physician in Florence for the Medici family. From 1694 (?) he wrote libretti for the theatre in Livorno and Florence and adapted  works by Jean Racine and Molière.; Salvi took many of his plots from French tragedy. Between 1701 and 1710 seven of his works were performed in the Villa di Pratolino. After the death of Ferdinando (III) de' Medici in 1713 he decided to work outside the Grand Duchy of Tuscany: in Rome, Reggio Emilia, Turin, Venice and Munich. His libretti were set to music by several famous composers including Scarlatti, Vivaldi and Handel. He died in Florence, aged 60.

Vivaldi wrote three operas for Florence to texts by Antonio Salvi. All were produced at the Teatro della Pergola.

Works 
 Astianatte (1701), based on Andromaque by Jean Racine, set to music by Giacomo Antonio Perti, Antonio Maria Bononcini, Francesco Gasparini, Vinci, Giovanni Bononcini and Niccolò Jommelli
 Arminio (1703), set to music by Alessandro Scarlatti, Antonio Caldara, Carlo Francesco Pollarolo, Johann Adolph Hasse, Georg Friedrich Handel and Baldassare Galuppi
 Dionisio Re di Portogallo (1707), set to music by Georg Friedrich Handel as Sosarme
 Ginevra Principessa di Scozia (1708), set to music by Giacomo Antonio Perti and Antonio Vivaldi; as Ariodante set to music by Carlo Francesco Pollarolo, Georg Friedrich Handel and Georg Christoph Wagenseil
 Berenice (1709), set to music by Georg Friedrich Handel
 Rodelinda Regina de' Longobardi (1710), set to music by Giacomo Antonio Perti, Georg Friedrich Handel and Carl Heinrich Graun
 Lucio Papirio (1714), set to music by Francesco Gasparini, Luca Antonio Predieri, Leonardo Leo and Nicola Antonio Porpora
 Il pazzo per politica (1717), set to music by Luca Antonio Predieri und Tomaso Albinoni (as Eumene)
 Scanderbeg (1718), set to music by Antonio Vivaldi
 Adelaide (1722), set to music by Pietro Torri, Nicola Antonio Porpora, Georg Friedrich Handel (as Lotario), Giuseppe Maria Orlandini and Antonio Vivaldi.

Sources

Italian poets
Italian male poets
17th-century Italian physicians
18th-century Italian physicians
Italian opera librettists
1664 births
1724 deaths
People from the Province of Arezzo
Italian male dramatists and playwrights
Grand Duchy of Tuscany people
18th-century Italian male writers
17th-century Italian male writers